Design by committee is a pejorative term for a project that has many designers involved but no unifying plan or vision.

Usage of the term
The term is used to refer to suboptimal traits that such a process may produce as a result of having to compromise between the requirements and viewpoints of the participants, particularly in the presence of poor leadership or poor technical knowledge, such as needless complexity, internal inconsistency, logical flaws, banality, and the lack of a unifying vision.  This design process by consensus is in contrast to autocratic design, or design by dictator, where the project leader decides on the design. The difference is that in an autocratic style, members of the organizations are not included and the final outcome is the responsibility of the leader.

The term is especially common in technical parlance; and stresses the need for technical quality over political feasibility. The proverb "too many cooks spoil the broth" expresses the same idea.

The term is commonly used in information and communications technology, especially when referring to the design of languages and technical standards, as demonstrated by USENET archives.

An example of a technical decision said to be a typical result of design by committee is the Asynchronous Transfer Mode (ATM) cell size of 53 bytes. The choice of 53 bytes was political rather than technical. When the CCITT was standardizing ATM, parties from the United States wanted a 64-byte payload. Parties from Europe wanted 32-byte payloads. Most of the European parties eventually came around to the arguments made by the Americans, but France and a few others held out for a shorter cell length of 32 bytes. A 53-byte size (48 bytes plus 5 byte header) was the compromise chosen.

The term is also common in other fields of design such as graphic design, architecture or industrial design. In automotive design, this process is often blamed for unpopular or poorly designed cars. 

An example described as naming by community was a school near Liverpool formed by the merger of several other schools: it was officially named the "Knowsley Park Centre for Learning, Serving Prescot, Whiston and the Wider Community" in 2009, listing as a compromise all the schools and communities merged into it. The name lasted seven years before its headmistress, who called the name "so embarrassing", cut it to simply "The Prescot School".

The F-35 Joint Strike Fighter has been described as designed by committee, due to being overscheduled, over budget, and underperforming expectations. It was originally conceived to serve the widely varying needs of multiple branches of the military all in one simple platform. This multi-interest approach has been pinpointed as largely responsible for its bloat, along with stacking too many new and unproven features into its design. Uneven progress across areas and unexpected challenges meant that major technical fixes and redesigns could halt the program's movement, requiring planes to be remedied even as they were being delivered.

Aphorisms
One maxim is that a camel is a horse designed by committee; this phrase has appeared in use in the United States as early as the 1950s.

See also 
 Groupthink
 The blind men and the elephant
 Wisdom of the crowd
 Tiger team

References

External links 
 Rod Johnson explains what is wrong with design by committee in the development of Java EE
 

Group processes
Design